Kobna Kuttah Holdbrook-Smith  (born 23 August 1977) is a Ghanaian-British actor. For his performance in Tina on the West End, he won the Laurence Olivier Award for Best Actor in a Musical.

Early life 
Holdbrook-Smith was born in Accra, Ghana. He grew up in Frimley, Surrey, England, where he lived with his mother, Tenu; his father, Henry; and his brother, Kofi. He was initially frightened of taking up acting due to his family's disapproval. "I was about 15, I thought, 'I wonder if I could [become an actor]'.  I hadn't really suggested it to anyone.  It just didn't seem allowed.  So there was a slow exploration of [acting] and by the time I was 18, I was resolute."

He attended Guildford School of Acting to study acting, graduating in 2000.

Career 
Holdbrook-Smith began his acting career on television in 2002 when he played Orlando Figes in the Judge John Deed episode "Everyone's Child". Since then, he has had roles in TV series such as Little Britain, Star Stories (from 2006 until 2008), Taking the Flak, Sirens, Holby City, Silk, Father Brown, The Last Panthers, Class, Dark Heart, The Split and  Red Election.

His first major theatre lead came in 2005, when he played Ken in Mustapha Matura's Playboy of the West Indies at the Tricycle Theatre. He later starred in their critically acclaimed African-American Season, performing in the European premieres of Walk Hard by Abram Hill, Fabulation by Lynn Nottage and Gem of the Ocean by August Wilson. In interviews he has cited August Wilson's plays as personal favourites. In 2006 he played Levee In Ma Rainey's Black Bottom by August Wilson at the Manchester Royal Exchange Theatre, then four years later he appeared as Herald Loomis in Joe Turner's Come and Gone by August Wilson at the Young Vic Theatre.

He first appeared at the Globe in 2007 in Love's Labours Lost, which he also performed later the same year at the National Theatre of Korea, in Seoul. Holdbrook-Smith had his debut at the National Theatre in 2009 and has since starred in four productions there (most notably appearing as Mortimer in Edward II). In 2015 he played Laertes alongside Benedict Cumberbatch in Hamlet at the Barbican Theatre. This play was also broadcast live in cinemas worldwide as part of National Theatre Live.

In 2016 Holdbrook-Smith performed with Benedict Cumberbatch again, this time in Marvel’s Dr Strange. A year later he played the part of Det. Crispus Allen in DC Comics Justice League and also starred as Warden Walker in Paddington 2, and as Father Emery in Ghost Stories. In 2018, he played the role of Oliver in The Commuter and Frye/Weasel in Disney’s Mary Poppins Returns.

Holdbrook-Smith has also performed in BBC Radio dramas, including Judas and On Her Majesty's Secret Service. He has narrated a number of audiobooks, most notably the Rivers of London series by Ben Aaronovitch.

Kobna Holdbrook-Smith is currently starring in the musical Tina as Ike Turner at the Aldwych Theatre.

He was appointed Member of the Order of the British Empire (MBE) in the 2020 Birthday Honours for services to drama, and was recognised as one of the United Kingdom's most influential people of African or African Caribbean heritage when Holdbrook-Smith was included in the 2021 edition of the annual Powerlist.

Filmography

Film

Television

Awards and nominations

Stage

References

External links
 

Alumni of the Guildford School of Acting
English male film actors
English male television actors
English male voice actors
English male stage actors
Audiobook narrators
Living people
1977 births
Members of the Order of the British Empire
People from Accra
People from Frimley
Ghanaian emigrants to England
Naturalised citizens of the United Kingdom